Michal Klec (born 5 December 1995) is a Slovak professional footballer who plays as a midfielder for Odra Opole.

Career
He made his Fortuna Liga debut for Žilina against Nitra on 2 November 2013, entering in as a substitute in place of Jaroslav Mihálik.

Honours

MŠK Žilina
Fortuna Liga: 2016-17

External links
 
 MŠK Žilina profile 
 Futbalnet profile

References

1995 births
Living people
Sportspeople from Žilina
Slovak footballers
Slovakia youth international footballers
Slovakia under-21 international footballers
Slovak expatriate footballers
Association football midfielders
MŠK Žilina players
FK Senica players
FK Fotbal Třinec players
FK Pohronie players
Puszcza Niepołomice players
Garbarnia Kraków players
Odra Opole players
Slovak Super Liga players
Czech National Football League players
I liga players
II liga players
Slovak expatriate sportspeople in the Czech Republic
Slovak expatriate sportspeople in Poland
Expatriate footballers in the Czech Republic
Expatriate footballers in Poland